Campos Lindos is a municipality located in the Brazilian state of Tocantins. Its population was 10,312 (2020) and its area is 3,240 km².

References

Municipalities in Tocantins